"Feelin' Way Too Damn Good" is a song by Canadian rock band Nickelback. Lead vocalist Chad Kroeger wrote the lyrics while the entire band composed the music. It was released on March 15, 2004, as the third single from their fourth studio album, The Long Road (2003). It reached the top 40 in Australia and the United Kingdom, topping the latter country's rock chart. It was also successful in Canada, peaking at number 26 on the Radio & Records CHR/Pop Top 30 chart and number four on the publication's Rock Top 30 listing.

Music video
The music video for "Feelin' Way Too Damn Good" is the last known Nickelback music video to feature former drummer Ryan Vikedal. He was later replaced by former 3 Doors Down drummer Daniel Adair.

The music video shows the band playing in what looks like a warehouse, where a light is shown floating around them, as well as what appear to be high school couples in various settings throughout the first half of the video. As the video continues, the couples are distracted by the light which has spread around them. The various groups follow the mysterious light to the warehouse that the band is playing in, and become captivated by both the light and the band for the duration of the video. The video ends with Nickelback disappearing with the mysterious light.

Track listings

US promo CD
 "Feelin' Way Too Damn Good"  – 3:51
 "Feelin' Way Too Damn Good"  – 4:15
 Radio ID – 0:03
 Radio ID – 0:04

UK CD single
 "Feelin' Way Too Damn Good"  – 3:50
 "Where Do I Hide"  – 3:42
 "Feelin' Way Too Damn Good"  – 4:15
 "Feelin' Way Too Damn Good" 

European CD single
 "Feelin' Way Too Damn Good"  – 3:50
 "Where Do I Hide"  – 3:42

Australian CD single
 "Feelin' Way Too Damn Good"  – 3:51
 "Leader of Men"  – 3:44
 "Feelin' Way Too Damn Good"  – 4:15

Personnel
 Nickelback – music, production
 Chad Kroeger – lyrics, lead vocals, guitar
 Ryan Peake – guitars, vocals
 Mike Kroeger – bass guitar
 Ryan Vikedal – drums
 Joey Moi – production, engineering
 Randy Staub – mixing
 Ron Burman – A&R
 Bryan Coleman – management

Charts

Release history

References

2003 songs
2004 singles
Nickelback songs
Roadrunner Records singles
Song recordings produced by Joey Moi
Songs written by Chad Kroeger
Songs written by Mike Kroeger
Songs written by Ryan Peake